Amar Singh Sokhi (born 2 July 1935) is an Indian former cyclist. He competed in three events at the 1964 Summer Olympics.

References

External links
 

1935 births
Living people
Indian male cyclists
Olympic cyclists of India
Cyclists at the 1964 Summer Olympics
Place of birth missing (living people)